Mohamed Ouadah (born 31 August 1994) is a French professional footballer who plays as a midfielder for Latvian Higher League club Riga FC.

Career
Ouadah began his senior career with Oissel from 2014 to 2019, and followed that with stints at Bastia-Borgo and Laval. On 2 July 2021, he signed a professional contract with Dunkerque. He made his professional debut with Dunkerque in a 1–1 Ligue 2 tie with Quevilly-Rouen on 24 July 2021.

On 24 August 2022, Ouadah sigend for Latvian club Riga FC.

Personal life
Born in France, Ouadah is of Algerian descent. His brother, Abdelali Ouadah, is also a professional footballer.

References

External links
 

1994 births
Living people
People from Louviers
French footballers
French sportspeople of Algerian descent
Association football midfielders
CMS Oissel players
FC Bastia-Borgo players
Stade Lavallois players
USL Dunkerque players
Riga FC players
Ligue 2 players
Championnat National players
Championnat National 2 players
Championnat National 3 players

Sportspeople from Eure
Footballers from Normandy
French expatriate footballers
Expatriate footballers in Latvia
French expatriate sportspeople in Latvia